Anna Villani (born 21 June 1966) is a retired female marathon runner from Italy.

Biography
Villani was born in Salerno.  She represented her native country at the 1992 Summer Olympics in Barcelona, Spain, where she ended up in 20th place in the women's marathon race. She set her personal best (2:31:06) in 1991.

Achievements

National titles
She has won 4 times the individual national championship.
4 wins in the half marathon (1985, 1991, 1992, 1993)

References

External links
 

1966 births
Living people
Italian female long-distance runners
Italian female marathon runners
Athletes (track and field) at the 1992 Summer Olympics
Olympic athletes of Italy
People from Salerno
European Athletics Championships medalists
World Athletics Championships athletes for Italy
Sportspeople from the Province of Salerno
20th-century Italian women
21st-century Italian women